MV Peveril was a coastal cargo vessel operated by the Isle of Man Steam Packet Company. Peveril, the third ship in the Company's history to bear the name, was built by Ailsa Shipbuilding Company at Troon, Scotland, in 1964.

Dimensions
Peveril was a steel constructed single-screw motor vessel. She cost £279,921 and was fitted with a 7-cylinder British Polar engine, direct-acting, developing 1400 brake horsepower. The vessel had crew accommodation for 14.

Service life
The second of the modern cargo ships to be built for the Company by the Ailsa yards, she was originally fitted with two 10-ton electric cranes - the first to be fitted to a Steam Packet ship. Peveril also had a special system for transporting livestock between her decks.

Although the Company's cargo services seemed settled for a decade or so, the container revolution rapidly changed everything; and by 1972 the service was almost fully utilized.
At Douglas a 28-ton derrick crane was erected and supporting improvements made to the adjacent warehousing.

Peveril returned to the Ailsa yards, where she was converted to a container ship. The cranes were removed and a cellular system for 56 standard units ( x  x ) was installed, together with enhanced provision for the carriage of livestock.

It was during September 1972, that Liverpool's southern docks were closed by the Mersey Docks and Harbour Company.
The Steam Packet ships had to accordingly leave the Coburg Dock from which cargo had been despatched since 1910, and moved to Hornby Dock which was rather closer to Douglas and was approached by a non tidal entrance.

The obsolete Fenella was sold at the beginning of 1973, and it was expected that Peveril would be able to handle all cargo traffic under the new container system.
However, the benefits of the containerized system produced startling growth, and in 1973 a 31% increase was recorded.

Consequently, the Company decided that a second containerized vessel would be required, and in November they purchased the Spaniel, which was renamed and entered service as the Conister. This purchase rendered Peveril's younger sister Ramsey as obsolete, as her conversion to a Container ship was not practical, and she was subsequently sold in 1974.

The combined capacity of the Peveril and Conister, was considered to be approximately 125,000 tons a year, and with this faith in containerization substantial growth continued during 1974 and 1975.

Disposal and subsequent use
The Peveril and Conister continued to provide a reliable operation on the Douglas - Liverpool cargo service. However, by the early 1980s the handling of containerized cargo at Douglas had undergone a revolutionary change with the arrival of Manxline, and their multi-purpose vessel Manx Viking.

It was apparent to the Steam Packet that in order to compete with their then rival shipping company, the introduction of a RO-RO cargo service was necessary. Both Peveril and Conister were put up for sale, and a new cargo vessel NF Jaguar was chartered - this vessel went on to be purchased, and renamed .

In 1981, Peveril was sold to Sea Doll Marine Co Ltd, Cyprus, and this was followed by numerous further sales, mostly within Cyprus. In 1982, she was acquired by Virginia Express Nav Co Ltd, Cyprus. This was followed by a further sale in 1983, this time to Akak Marine Co Ltd. Again, operating under the Cypriot flag, she was purchased by Flourishing Marine Ltd, Cyprus in 1991 until the following year 1992, when G M Khatib R M A Kojok, Lebanon took ownership of her. They sold her in 1999 to other Lebanese interests until she was sold for breaking. She was scrapped in Aliağa, Turkey, in April 2001.

References

Bibliography
 Chappell, Connery (1980). Island Lifeline T.Stephenson & Sons Ltd

Further reading

External links
The Shipbuilder and marine engine-builder, Volume 71
The official guide to the London and north western railway
Is this any way to run a shipping line?
 Modern shipbuilding and the men engaged in it: a review of recent progress
Shipbuilding and shipping record, Volume 105
International shipping & shipbuilding directory, Volume 1
Marine news, Volume 39 Sale to Akak Marine.
Marine news, Volume 36 Renamed to Nadalena H.
The Motor Ship
Shipbuilding & marine engineering international, Volume 96 Refitting to cellular container ship.
West coast steamers Relation to Fenella.
The Times reports of debates in the Manx Legislature, Volume 102

1963 ships
Ships of the Isle of Man Steam Packet Company
Ships built on the River Clyde
Merchant ships of the Isle of Man
Merchant ships of Cyprus
Merchant ships of Lebanon
Container ships